Kamuela Kahoano (born December 27, 1980) is a singer/songwriter, painter/visual artist and music producer from Honolulu, Hawaii. His music has elements of acoustic, folk, indie and alternative with Hawaiian influences. He performs solo and was formerly the lead singer of the band Analog(ic).  He is an accomplished player of both the ukulele and guitar, playing both left-handed; he also plays the djembe. Kahoano claims many influences, including Coldplay, U2 and the Beatles.

Kahoano is a board member of the Ryan's Light Foundation.

Early life 
He comes from a family of entertainers. His father, Kimo Kahoano began his career as a Polynesian fire knife dancer and continued as an actor, singer, DJ and emcee. His mother is Lynette Kahoano. His older brothers, Ikaika and Haku, worked in the entertainment industry.

Kahoano grew up in the Kapahulu neighborhood near Waikiki, and started playing music at 6 years old on a ukulele given to him by his grandmother.

Kamuela attended Iolani School, graduating in 1998.  He obtained his bachelor's in Music Composition in 2004 from the University of Hawaii at Manoa.

Career 
His debut album, Green Light Go, was released January 2007.  His latest, Stream Dreams, was released July 14, 2010. He toured with the Slack Key Festival (2017–).

He records for Green Light Go / Kahoano Productions. His production company is Green Light Go HI Productions.

Discography 
 Green Light Go (January 2007)
 Grumpy (She's Grumpy It's My Fault) (single, 2007)
 Manalani (Ukulele Solo) (single, 2007)
 Stream Dreams (July 14, 2010)
 Portraits (Album) (CD, 2017) Became a 2018 Na Hoku Hanohano Nominee.
 Higher (EP) (CD, 2019) 2020 Na Hoku Hanohano Winner for "Best EP (Extended Play)"
 Wot?! (Album) (CD, 2019) 2020 Na Hoku Hanohano Nominee for "Best Contemporary Album".
 Love You Anyway (single, 2020)

Awards 
Kahoano won a Na Hoku Hanohano Award in 2011 for Rock Album of the year.

Kahoano won a Na Hoku Hanohano Award in 2020 for "EP ("Extended Play") of the Year" for "Higher"

References

Further reading 

Interview with Kamuela Kahoano at the Na Hoku O Hawai`i Music Festival, May 2010

External links 
 

1980 births
American male pop singers
American male singer-songwriters
Living people
ʻIolani School alumni
University of Hawaiʻi at Mānoa alumni
Na Hoku Hanohano Award winners
21st-century American singers
21st-century American male singers
Singer-songwriters from Hawaii